Giorgos Boutris (alternate spellings: Georgios, Mpoutris) (born July 24, 1995) is a Greek professional basketball player for AEK Athens of the Greek Basket League. He is 1.90 m (6 ft 3 in) tall.

Youth career
Boutris played from a young age with AEK Athens, before he started his pro career.

Professional career
Boutris signed his first professional contract with AEK Athens on 23 September 2014. After that he signed with Mandraikos BC and won the championship (Greece C Basketball League) . Now he is playing for Aris Petroupolis BC.

References

External links
Greek Basket League Profile 
Eurobasket.com Profile
RealGM.com Profile
My Player.gr Profile
AEK Profile

1995 births
Living people
AEK B.C. players
Greek men's basketball players
Greek Basket League players
Point guards
Basketball players from Athens